St Clements Hospital was a mental health hospital located between Mile End and Bow, in the East End of London.

History
The building opened in a former workhouse building as the City of London Union Infirmary in 1874. The palatial design of the workhouse had been created by architect Richard Tress and had cost over £55,000 to construct, boasted central heating, a dining-hall measuring 100 feet by 50 feet, Siberian marble pillars, and a chapel with stained glass windows and a new organ. It closed in 1909 but re-opened as a hospital for chronically ill people becoming known as the City of London Institution in 1912 and as the Bow Institution in 1913. It became a psychiatric unit, known by its most commonly adopted name of 'St Clement's Hospital' in 1936. The west side of the site suffered extensive bomb damage during the war, destroying the chapel and the sites initial symmetry.  The hospital joined the newly formerd National Health Service in 1948 and then came under the same management as the London Hospital in 1968. After services were transferred to a new Adult Mental Health Facility at Mile End Hospital, the hospital closed in February 2006.

London's First Community Land Trust 
Following the hospital's closure the site was transferred from the NHS to English Partnerships, then to the Homes and Communities Agency, and eventually the Greater London Authority, who marketed it as a regeneration opportunity in 2011.  Following a long campaign, the Greater London Authority announced in April 2012 that the site would include London's first Community Land Trust. Mayor of London Boris Johnson broke the ground on the site in March 2014. The house prices are not based on the open market rate but instead are linked to the average median salaries in the London Borough of Tower Hamlets.  This formula is reapplied every time a house within the Trust is sold, creating what organisers describe as "truly and permanently affordable housing".

See also 
 Healthcare in London
 List of hospitals in England
Community Land Trust
London CLT

Notes

Residential buildings completed in 1849
Defunct hospitals in London
Health in the London Borough of Tower Hamlets
Buildings and structures in the London Borough of Tower Hamlets
Former psychiatric hospitals in England
1849 establishments in England
Bow
Mile End